Kasper Hornbæk is a Professor of Computer Science at the University of Copenhagen. He was inducted into the CHI Academy in 2020.

Kasper Hornbæk received both his M.Sc. as well as his Ph.D. in Computer Science from the University of Copenhagen. He is best known for his work on usability in human-computer interaction.

He is section head of the Human Centered Computing group at the UCPH Department of Computer Science.

In 2020 he was induced into the CHI Academy.

References 

1972 births
Living people
People from Roskilde
University of Copenhagen alumni
Academic staff of the University of Copenhagen
Danish computer scientists